Leo Wyatt is a fictional character from The WB television series Charmed, portrayed by Brian Krause. A possible breakout character included in the writing initially as a love interest beginning in the first season that initially set Phoebe and Piper bickering and competing for his attention. He appeared as a guest star in seven episodes of the first season and six episodes of the second season. Midway through the second season, he joined the main cast and appeared in all but 11 episodes for the rest of the series' run. All together, he appeared in 145 episodes—the most of any male character in the series, and the most of any character who was not a Halliwell by birth.

For most of the series' first five seasons and part of the seventh, Leo was the Charmed Ones' Whitelighter—a guardian angel and mentor in all things magical to the three sisters as they grow in their power. As a Whitelighter and later an Elder, Leo had the ability to orb (magically teleport) from place to place. He could also sense his charges (those he guided), that is, he could telepathically hear and locate them. Other powers included hovering, healing physical wounds, and changing his appearance (glamoring). He was nearly immortal, but like all Whitelighters, he was vulnerable to a Darklighter's poison arrow. He eventually wins Piper's heart, and they marry in the middle of season three. They have two sons, Wyatt and Chris, and a daughter, Melinda.

In the series' fifth, sixth, and seventh seasons he became in succession an Elder, and then an Avatar. However, late in the seventh season he became a normal human, albeit one with great knowledge of magic. In the 8th season, however, Leo is hunted by the angel of death and killed in a car wreck. The sisters summon an Angel of Destiny in attempt to save him, who returns him to the sisters, alive, in the series finale.

Life prior to the Charmed Ones
Leo was born May 6, 1924 in San Francisco, California, the son of Richard Christopher Wyatt. He grew up in Burlingame, a southern suburb of San Francisco.

Leo was a medic for the United States Army in World War II with a dream to become a doctor. While taking part in the Battle of Guadalcanal on November 14, 1942, two of his friends with whom he grew up, Nathan and Rick Lang, were killed and  Leo blamed himself for their deaths as he felt he abandoned them when he left to help other wounded soldiers in the field. Upon his own death a short time later, Leo was posthumously awarded the Medal of Honor and became a Whitelighter for his good deeds.

Leo was married to a woman named Lillian in his mortal life and when he died, he appeared to her in a dream and encouraged her to move on with her life. Like all whitelighters, Leo is a pacifist, disallowed by the Elders to kill. Leo has watched over many of his charges; those who were future Whitelighters and good witches.

In the late 1960s, Leo befriended Penny and Allen Halliwell, the grandparents of the Charmed Ones.

Whitelighter of the Charmed Ones
Shortly after the Charmed Ones discovered their powers, Leo, posing as a handyman, was hired to fix up their house. Since he was not supposed to reveal himself as their Whitelighter, he used this as an opportunity to keep watch on them Piper and Phoebe became attracted to him, although Phoebe only liked him because Piper did (was revealed in later episode). As Leo worked on their house, Piper and Phoebe competed for his attention, though his feelings were reciprocated with Piper.

When the warlock Rex Buckland tricked the Charmed Ones into giving up their powers, Leo "healed" the Book of Shadows and restored them. Shortly afterward, Leo had to leave town and take another charge, but he watched over and guided the Charmed Ones on many occasions.

When Leo returned, Phoebe discovered him levitating to change a light bulb and he confessed the truth to her. He also told her that as much as he loved Piper, he did not think their relationship could continue; witches and Whitelighters are not meant to be together. He was later shot by a Darklighter's poison arrow while attempting to protect one of his charges. He went to the manor for aid, where Prue and Piper learned he was a Whitelighter. Piper used a spell to switch powers with Leo, so she could heal him. Piper then confessed she still loved him, but unfortunately Leo is still unconscious due to the poisoned arrow. Leo's "trigger" to make the healing power work was love, and because of Pipers confession, he was healed. Leo offered to give up being a Whitelighter to be with Piper, but she did not want him to turn away from his calling.

Piper went to the future with Phoebe and Prue, and learned that she and Leo were divorced, and they had a daughter named Melinda Halliwell. Although Piper still loved Leo, she also wanted a normal romance. Feeling Leo could not provide that, she started a romance with her new neighbor, Dan Gordon.

When Piper became sick with a terminal illness, the Elders forbade Leo to heal her since it was not caused magically. Leo broke that rule when he saved Piper from the disease. Because of that, Leo was suspended from being a Whitelighter, though he remained a purely good person, with no evil in him.

Marriage to Piper and their family
Leo eventually earned his 'wings' back as well as Piper's heart. He asked Piper to marry him when they got back from the Heavens. However, the Elders were vehemently opposed to this. They tried to marry in late 2000, but the Elders forcibly orbed him away just as the ceremony was beginning. The Elders ultimately allowed Leo to return, but placed him on probation to make sure their love wasn't interfering with their duties.

The Elders eventually lifted their probation on Leo and allowed him to be engaged to Piper. The ceremony was performed by Grams, and the Elders allowed Patty Halliwell to return from the dead for one day to witness her daughter's wedding. Prue and Phoebe served as bridesmaids. The ceremony was also attended by Victor Bennett, Darryl Morris, and Cole.

Throughout the fourth season, Leo and Piper discuss having a baby, and the problems that come with having a magical child. More than a year later, Piper became pregnant. Piper gives birth to their son, Wyatt Matthew Halliwell, named for Leo's surname, for being a very protective father and to honor his past life—thus breaking the tradition of every Halliwell's first name starting with a "P". The couple does not decide to bind Wyatt's powers, as was hypothetically discussed in previous episodes.

Leo's marriage to Piper was somewhat turbulent, especially when he became promoted to an Elder after saving them. As an Elder, Leo was not allowed to live with his family, though he promised always to watch over them. However, Leo is highly mistrustful of the Charmed Ones' new Whitelighter, Chris Perry, and stays involved in the family's life as he tries to figure Chris out. Later, it is revealed that Chris is actually Leo and Piper's second son. Chris admits to Leo that in the future, he was always there for Wyatt, for the Charmed Ones, but never for him, as he was often eclipsed by Wyatt's "Chosen One" and ultimate power status, leaving him with a near hatred of the future Leo.

While on the run and hiding the truth from the other Elders after murdering Gideon, Leo becomes reunited with his family. When the Elders decide to test Leo's faith once and for all to determine if his destiny is to be an Elder or to be with his family, he is turned mortal with no memory of Piper, her sisters, or his children and is turned back into an Elder after his path had been "chosen". Phoebe and Paige help convince Leo that his true destiny is with his family and when Leo realizes that is true, he is made mortal for good and free to live his life with Piper and their children.

We learn in the Charmed comic series that Leo and Piper have named their third child, and only daughter, Melinda.

Life as an Elder
When Leo was promoted to be an Elder he had to leave his family behind. However, he managed to watch over them, especially his son, as he was given rights to visit him. However his appointment cost him his marriage to Piper. Chris Perry, the whitelighter from the future, had taken his place as the Charmed Ones' new whitelighter.

Since Piper and Leo's parting, Piper had become increasingly happy. Alarmed by her change in attitude, Paige and Phoebe told Chris to ask Leo about Piper, but Chris admitted that Leo had been kidnapped. When Paige and Phoebe told Piper that Leo was missing, she was oddly unaffected by the news, not really remembering their parting. But when the sisters finally found Leo, Piper's memories came flooding back. She demanded to know why she did not remember Leo leaving her, and Leo told her that he used his powers to make her forget and not feel as much pain. Not wanting to face the pain and anger she felt toward Leo, Piper became a Valkyrie. Phoebe and Paige confronted Piper, using a spell to make Piper feel her suppressed emotions. Once confronted with her pain, Piper realized that she did not belong with the Valkyries and returned home. Leo apologized to Piper for taking away her feelings. Piper said that she understood that he was only trying to help, but she told him that since he was still an Elder she would appreciate his keeping his distance so that she might move on with her life.

Even though Piper tried to distance herself from Leo, she realized how much Leo missed Wyatt and how much Wyatt missed his daddy, so she told him that he could visit as much as he wanted when she was not around. But much to Leo's disappointment, Piper asked him for a divorce when she started to date again. Despite this, they apparently never did divorce.

When a demon used the power of a genie to wish the Charmed Ones dead, Leo's connection to Piper saved the sisters. Even though he and Piper were in a magically-induced sleep, Leo heard Piper's cries for help when her spirit began to move to the afterlife and he healed her. This incident drew Piper closer to Leo, as she was reminded of her connection to him.

After Leo and Piper were trapped in the Ghostly Plane, Leo revealed he still loved her and they made love and Piper got pregnant with their second child, who happened to be Chris.

When Leo finally found out that Piper was pregnant again and Chris was their son, he decided that his place was to stay with his family. Trying to absorb the situation, Leo took his time in approaching Piper about the impending birth of their son and the future of their relationship. While Piper admitted that she thought about them becoming a family again, she tried not to because things had not changed — Leo was still an Elder.

When Leo learned that his mentor Gideon was after Wyatt and that Gideon had killed Chris, Leo avenged his son by killing Gideon, using his powers as an Elder. He returned to be at the side of his family, possibly for good.

Leo has been hunting for Barbas since he teamed up with Gideon to find Wyatt in the Underworld, and he and the Charmed Ones suspects that Gideon may not be the only Elder who feels that Wyatt may turn evil. Leo was tricked by Barbas into killing the Elder, Zola, who once tried to reach out to Leo to help him.

Leo was not trusted by the Whitelighter Elders, however, he had to return to his status, to prepare for the "Gathering Storm". Unfortunately, he and Piper had planned for him to move back in with them, but he felt that he was too dangerous.

Life as an Avatar

Leo was being seemingly haunted by a ghostly headed figure, that turned out to be the lead Avatar, trying to recruit Leo and add his power to the collective. In the Episode (7x07) Someone to Witch Over Me, Leo finally becomes an avatar after Piper and Phoebe are killed and the lead Avatar tells him as an avatar he can save them, which he does with his newfound powers.

Leo then joined the Avatars, and was granted even greater powers. After he informed the Halliwell sisters of his new status, Leo was a target for Agent Kyle Brody. However, Leo soon became aware that the world the Avatars wanted to make was not the nice world he had hoped for. To convince the sisters, Leo sacrificed himself by getting angry, thus forcing the Avatars to vanquish him (as the Avatars did to all who have negative feelings), but as he was dying, he relayed a message to Phoebe, who remembered, and then took it upon herself to make sure her sisters felt pain in order to see that what the Avatars were doing was wrong. The sisters worked with Zankou in order to get the Avatars to change the world back so that it was no longer a Utopian community. Time was then turned back to the point before the Avatars changed the world, and Leo was restored, although he no longer had his Avatar powers.

Now the Elders were left with the question of how to punish Leo for becoming an Avatar. They finally decided to relocate him on Earth and take away his memory. They said Leo would somehow find his way back and choose between rejoining his family or becoming an Elder full-time. However, the Elders cheated on this test and tricked Leo into rejoining them. But when Phoebe and Paige confronted the Elders on this, Leo came with them. At that time, a dying Piper (she had been poisoned by a Thorn Demon) called out to Leo, urged on by Cole Turner. Leo heard her and chose to "fall from grace". Leo thus gave up his powers and his Elder status and became a mortal human, but he got his memory back. Leo then returned home to Piper and their two sons. Piper was healed from her wound by Wyatt with the help of Drake. The next morning, Leo confesses to Piper that he is actually happy about losing his powers.

Life as a human
Leo and Piper had a hard time adjusting to Leo being a powerless human. After some trouble with Zankou, Piper and Phoebe decided to ask Leo to become the new Headmaster of the Magic School instead of Paige, who wants to try something new. They think Leo is perfect for the position because he's a "walking Book of Shadows": he has lost his powers, but not his knowledge of magic. Paige orbs away as Leo accepts.

Leo "died" with the Halliwell sisters, adopting the name of Louis Bennett, but soon got back to his old life and name.

Leo and Piper went to a magical marriage counselor, but things did not turn out as well as they had hoped. Their counselor needed them to see how each of their lives was in order to get them closer to each other. In order to do this, the marriage counselor had them switch bodies in order to walk a mile in each other's shoes.

The series finale and the future
In the last season of the series, Leo was the target of the Angel of Death. The sisters searched for a key to undo his death sentence. Piper summoned both an Elder and an Avatar to give Leo a new lease on life, but both were forbidden to do so. In turn the sisters summoned the Angel of Destiny, who warned them of an impending great evil force, that Leo's death would be the only motivation to give the sisters the will to fight the great evil, in the same manner that their sister Prue's death motivated them to defeat The Source. So Piper begged the Angel of Destiny for a compromise, insisting that if they were to fight for Leo's life instead, that would be even more strongly motivating to defeat said coming great evil. So it's decided that Leo will be frozen in stasis only to be returned if they succeed in defeating this great evil. Only then can they save his life and have him returned to Piper.

After the destruction of the manor and the deaths of Phoebe, Paige, and Christy Jenkins, Leo was returned as promised by the Angel of Destiny. Had he not intervened, Piper might have killed Billie Jenkins in an act of revenge for the death of her sisters. With the manor destroyed, Leo and Piper leave the area.

Piper and Leo travel back to the past in the hopes of fixing the present, and save the future so that Phoebe and Paige get to live. After they change things in the past they are able to fix things so that Phoebe and Paige are able to survive in the future. So Leo is returned to Piper, and Coop and Phoebe get married. In the very final episode they are shown to have started a family.

In an alternative future in the second season episode named "Morality Bites," where witches are burned at the stake, Piper and Leo have a different child, a young daughter named Melinda. (Season 2, episode # 2.)
In the main timeline of the future, Leo returns to Magic School as a teacher. At the end of the finale they finish the Book of Shadows by writing about their lives so all their future generations will be prepared to continue the fight against demons, warlocks, and other forms of evil. The final shot of them is Leo and Piper, old and still very much in love, walking upstairs past pictures of their whole family hanging on the walls, as they make their way to their bedroom to go lie down - they rest in each other's arms, smiling, content with their lives.

Episode footnotes

References

Charmed (TV series) characters
Fictional angels
Fictional avatars
Fictional Medal of Honor recipients
Fictional principals and headteachers
Fictional schoolteachers
Fictional shapeshifters
Fictional World War II veterans
Television characters introduced in 1998
Fictional characters who can teleport
Fictional characters with healing abilities

ru:Список персонажей телесериала «Зачарованные»#Лео Уайатт